This is an incomplete list of ghost towns in South Dakota, United States of America.

Classification 

Ghost towns can include sites in various states of disrepair and abandonment. Some sites no longer have any trace of civilization and have reverted to pasture land or empty fields. Other sites are unpopulated but still have standing buildings.

Barren site 
 Sites no longer in existence or have been destroyed
 Deserted or barren
 Covered with water
 Reverted to pasture
 May have a few difficult-to-find foundations/footings at most

Neglected site 
 Only rubble left
 Buildings or houses still standing, but majority are roofless

Abandoned site 
 Building or houses still standing but all abandoned
 No population, except possibly a caretaker
 Site no longer in existence except for one or two buildings

Ghost towns

A through B

C through D

E through H

I through L

M through O

P through R

S through T

V through Z

Notes

References 

 
South Dakota geography-related lists
South Dakota
Lists of places in South Dakota
American Old West-related lists